Tingena hemimochla is a species of moth in the family Oecophoridae. It is endemic to New Zealand and has been observed in the North Island. Adults of this species are on the wing from December until March.

Taxonomy

This species was first described by Edward Meyrick in 1883 using specimens collected at Hamilton, Wellington and Napier in January and March. He originally named the species Oecophora hemimochla. Meyrick went on to give a fuller description of the species in 1884. In 1915 Meyrick placed this species within the Borkhausenia genus. In 1926 Alfred Philpott studied the genitalia of the female of this species. George Hudson discussed this species under the name B. hemimochla in his 1928 publication The butterflies and moths of New Zealand. In 1988 J. S. Dugdale placed this species in the genus Tingena. The male lectotype, collected at the Wellington Botanic Garden, is held at the Natural History Museum, London. In 2004 the phylogenetic relationship of this species to similar species was studied.

Description 

Meyrick originally described this species as follows:

Meyrick in 1884 described this species as follows:

Distribution 
This species is endemic to New Zealand and has been observed near Lake Ohia, Pairatahi, Hamilton, Cambridge, Wellington and Napier.

Behaviour 
The adults of this species are on the wing from December until March.

References

Oecophoridae
Moths of New Zealand
Moths described in 1883
Endemic fauna of New Zealand
Taxa named by Edward Meyrick
Endemic moths of New Zealand